The men's ISSF 25 meter rapid fire pistol was a shooting sports event held as part of the Shooting at the 1964 Summer Olympics programme. It was the 12th appearance of the event. The competition was held on 19 October 1964 at the Camp Asaka shooting ranges in Tokyo. 53 shooters from 34 nations competed. Nations had been limited to two shooters each since the 1952 Games. The event was won by Pentti Linnosvuo of Finland, the nation's first victory in the event. Linnosvuo was the fourth man to win multiple medals in the event, adding to his 1960 silver; it was his fourth straight Games finishing in the top 5 of the event. Ion Tripșa of Romania took silver, putting that nation back on the podium after a one-Games absence. Czechoslovakia's first rapid fire pistol medal came in the form of Lubomír Nácovský's bronze.

Background

This was the 12th appearance of what had been standardised in 1948 as the men's ISSF 25 meter rapid fire pistol event, the only event on the 2020 programme that traces back to 1896. The event has been held at every Summer Olympics except 1904 and 1928 (when no shooting events were held) and 1908; it was nominally open to women from 1968 to 1980, although very few women participated these years. There is no women's equivalent on the Olympic programme, as of 2021. The first five events were quite different, with some level of consistency finally beginning with the 1932 event—which, though it had differences from the 1924 competition, was roughly similar. The 1936 competition followed the 1932 one quite closely. The post-World War II event substantially altered the competition once again.

The top four of the top 10 shooters from 1960 returned: gold medalist William McMillan of the United States, silver medalist (and top five finisher in both 1952 and 1956) Pentti Linnosvuo of Finland, bronze medalist Aleksandr Zabelin of the Soviet Union, and fourth-place finisher Hansruedi Schneider of Switzerland. Zabelin was the reigning (1962) world championship, with he his countryman and runner-up Igor Bakalov making up a formidable Soviet team in Tokyo. Szilárd Kun of Hungary, the 1952 silver medalist, also made a return to Olympic competition.

Kenya and Malaysia each made their debut in the event. The United States made its 10th appearance in the event, most of any nation.

Competition format

The competition format followed the 1948 format, now very close to the modern rapid fire pistol competition after significant variation before World War II. Each shooter fired 60 shots. These were done in two courses of 30; each course consisted of two stages of 15; each stage consisted of three series of 5. In each stage, the time limit for each series was 8 seconds for the first, 6 seconds for the second, and 4 seconds for the third. 

A holdover from the previous Games was that full-body silhouettes, rather than round targets, continued to be used; however, scoring rings had been added so that now each shot was scored up to 10 rather than being strictly hit or miss.

One change from 1948–1956 was that hits were no longer the primary measurement of success. As in 1960, ranking was done by score, regardless of hits.

Records

Prior to the competition, the existing world and Olympic records were as follows.

The top seven shooters beat the Olympic record, with the 8th through 10th place finishers matching it. Pentti Linnosvuo finished with the new record at 592 points.

Schedule

Results

References

Shooting at the 1964 Summer Olympics
Men's 1964